The gogona is a type of jaw harp, a vibrating reed instrument that is used primarily in the traditional Bihu music in Assam. In Boro language, it is known as Gongina. It is made of a piece of bamboo/horn that has a bifurcation on one end. The solid end is gripped with the teeth and the free ends are then struck repeatedly with the fingers to emit the distinctive sound of the gogona. It was originally developed in ancient China(Kouxian) and passed on to the Sino-Tibetan tribes who migrated to Assam, now chiefly used by the Sadiyal Kacharis(Chutias, Deoris, Sonowals).

Types
 Ramdhan Gogona is generally played by men. It is shorter, wider and slightly heavier than the Lahori Gogona, to fit properly in a typical man's hand. This instrument is often tucked in a tongali tied around the performer's waist or in a vivid Gamusa tied around the head like other instruments like Bahi (Flute), Xutuli etc.
 Lahori Gogona  is made to fit a woman's hand, so it is slightly slimmer and longer than the Ramdhan Gogona. It is generally tucked into a hair knot while performing the vibrant Bihu dance.

See also
 Angkouch, Cambodia
 Bihu
 Dhol
 Jaw's harp
 Lamellophones
 Music of Assam
 Pepa
 Taal

References

External links

 Fact and video 

Indian musical instruments
Musical instruments of Assam
Idioglot guimbardes and jaw harps